Dumanis is a surname. Notable people with the surname include:

Bonnie Dumanis (born 1951), American judge
Michael Dumanis (born 1976), American poet, academic, and editor